Jalan Ulu Tiram or Jalan Sungai Tiram (Johor state road J8) is a major road in Johor, Malaysia.

List of junctions 

Roads in Johor